Parco Safari delle Langhe is a Safari park, Zoo and Amusement park in Murazzano, Piedmont, northern Italy, created in 1976; extending over an area of 700.000 square metres.

External links
Official website

References 

Safari parks
Zoos in Italy
Tourist attractions in Piedmont
Parks in Piedmont
Buildings and structures in Piedmont
Zoos established in 1976
1976 establishments in Italy